PepsiCo, Inc. is an American multinational food, snack, and beverage corporation headquartered in Harrison, New York, in the hamlet of Purchase. PepsiCo's business encompasses all aspects of the food and beverage market. It oversees the manufacturing, distribution, and marketing of its products. PepsiCo was formed in 1965 with the merger of the Pepsi-Cola Company and Frito-Lay, Inc. PepsiCo has since expanded from its namesake product Pepsi Cola to an immensely diversified range of food and beverage brands. The largest and most recent acquisition was Pioneer Foods in 2020 for US$1.7 billion and prior to it was buying the Quaker Oats Company in 2001, which added the Gatorade brand to the Pepsi portfolio and Tropicana Products in 1998.

As of January 2021, the company possesses 23 brands that have over US$1 billion in sales annually. PepsiCo has operations all around the world and its products were distributed across more than 200 countries, resulting in annual net revenues of over US$70 billion. PepsiCo is the second-largest food and beverage business in the world based on net revenue, profit, and market capitalization, behind Nestlé. PepsiCo's flagship product, Pepsi Cola has been engaged in a rivalry for generations with Coca-Cola; it is commonly referred to as the cola wars. Although Coca-Cola outsells Pepsi Cola in the United States, PepsiCo within the North American market is the largest food and beverage company by net revenue. Ramon Laguarta has been the chief executive of PepsiCo since 2018. The company's beverage distribution and bottling is conducted by PepsiCo as well as by licensed bottlers in certain regions.

Pepsi has been repeatedly criticized by environmentalists for its relationship to negative environmental impacts of agriculture in its supply chain, and distributing operations such as palm oil-related deforestation and pesticide use, its use of water resources, and the negative impacts of its packaging—Pepsi's packaging has consistently been one of the top sources of plastic pollution globally.  Similarly public health advocates have criticized Pepsi's high-calorie, poor nutrition product lines along with other popular snack and drink manufacturers. In response PepsiCo has made public comments on its commitment to minimizing their impact but has not released public information documenting progress on most of its public commitments.

History

Origins
The soft drink Pepsi was developed by Caleb Bradham, a pharmacist and businessman from Duplin County, North Carolina. He coined the name "Pepsi-Cola" in 1898 marketing the drink from his pharmacy in New Bern, North Carolina. As his drink gained popularity Bradham founded the Pepsi-Cola Company in 1902 and registered a patent for his recipe in 1903. The company was incorporated in Delaware in 1919. Bradham's company experienced years of success leading up to World War I. However, sugar rationing during the war and a volatile sugar market in the war's aftermath damaged the company's financial health to such a degree that in 1923, Bradham declared bankruptcy and returned to running pharmacies in North Carolina.

On June 8, 1923, the company trademark and secret recipe were purchased by Craven Holding Corporation. In 1931, Roy Megargel, a Wall Street broker, purchased the Pepsi trademark, business, and goodwill from Craven Holding in association with Charles Guth. Guth was also the president of Loft, Incorporated, a leading candy manufacturer based in Long Island City, New York. Loft ran a network with 115 stores across the Mid Atlantic at the time of Guth's acquisition. Guth used Loft's labs and chemists to reformulate the Pepsi syrup recipe, and he used his position as president of the company to replace Coca-Cola with Pepsi Cola at Loft's shops and restaurants. Guth also used Loft resources to promote Pepsi, and moved the soda company to a location close by Loft's own facilities in New York City.

In 1935, the shareholders of Loft sued Guth for his 91% stake of Pepsi-Cola Company in the landmark case Guth v. Loft Inc. Loft won the suit and on May 29, 1941, formally absorbed Pepsi into Loft, which was then re-branded as Pepsi-Cola Company that same year. Loft restaurants and candy stores were spun off at this time.

In the early 1960s, Pepsi-Cola's product lines expanded with the creation of Diet Pepsi and purchase of Mountain Dew. In 1965, the Pepsi-Cola Company merged with Frito-Lay, Inc. to become PepsiCo, Inc. At the time of its foundation, PepsiCo was incorporated in the state of Delaware and headquartered in Manhattan, New York. The company's headquarters were relocated to the present location of Purchase, New York in 1970, and in 1986 PepsiCo was reincorporated in the state of North Carolina. After 39 years trading on the New York Stock Exchange, PepsiCo moved its shares to Nasdaq on December 20, 2017.

Acquisitions and divestments
Between the late-1970s and the mid-1990s, PepsiCo expanded via acquisition of businesses outside of its core focus of packaged food and beverage brands; however it exited these non-core business lines largely in 1997, selling some, and spinning off others into a new company named Tricon Global Restaurants, which later became known as Yum! Brands, Inc. PepsiCo also previously owned several other brands that it later sold so it could focus on its primary snack food and beverage lines, according to investment analysts reporting on the divestments in 1997. Brands formerly owned by PepsiCo include: Pizza Hut, Taco Bell, KFC, Hot 'n Now, East Side Mario's, D'Angelo Sandwich Shops, Chevys Fresh Mex, California Pizza Kitchen, Stolichnaya (via licensed agreement), Wilson Sporting Goods, and North American Van Lines.

The divestments concluding in 1997 were followed by multiple large-scale acquisitions, as PepsiCo began to extend its operations beyond soft drinks and snack foods into other lines of foods and beverages. PepsiCo purchased the orange juice company Tropicana Products in 1998, and merged with Quaker Oats Company in 2001, adding with it the Gatorade sports drink line and other Quaker Oats brands such as Chewy Granola Bars and Aunt Jemima, among others.

In August 2009, PepsiCo made a US$7 billion offer to acquire the two largest bottlers of its products in North America: Pepsi Bottling Group and PepsiAmericas. In 2010 this acquisition was completed, resulting in the formation of a new wholly owned subsidiary of PepsiCo, Pepsi Beverages Company.

In February 2011, the company made its largest international acquisition by purchasing a two-thirds (majority) stake in Wimm-Bill-Dann Foods, a Russian food company that produces milk, yogurt, fruit juices, and dairy products. When it acquired the remaining 23% stake of Wimm-Bill-Dann Foods in October 2011, PepsiCo became the largest food and beverage company in Russia.

In July 2012, PepsiCo announced a joint venture with the Theo Muller Group which was named Muller Quaker Dairy. This marked PepsiCo's first entry into the dairy space in the U.S. The joint venture was dissolved in December 2015.

On May 25, 2018, PepsiCo announced that it would acquire fruit and veggie snack maker Bare Foods. It will also quarter-own allMotti in late November 2018 and it will be PepsiCo's first owned Tech and Computer Service company.

On August 20, 2018, PepsiCo announced that it had entered into agreement to acquire SodaStream. The purchase was completed in December 2018 as part of a strategic plan to steer Pepsi toward offering healthier products.

In 2019, PepsiCo sued four small farmers in India US$142,000 each for growing a type of potato it says it owns. Pepsi said they would end the suit if the farmers grew potatoes for them. A number of Farmers' associations are requesting that the government get involved in the case stating that Pepsi is attempting to intimidate people. After pressure from the public as well as state and national governments, PepsiCo withdrew the lawsuit on May 2, 2019.

On October 3, 2019, PepsiCo announced that they will leave Indonesia after terminating their partnership with local distributor PT Anugerah Indofood Barokah Makmur (AIBM). Both companies stopped production of PepsiCo products on October 10. This has resulted in KFC and Pizza Hut chains in the country to switch to Coca-Cola products.

On December 2, 2019, PepsiCo acquired the snacks brand, BFY Brands, who are going to be folded into the Frito-Lay division.

In March 2020, PepsiCo announced that it had entered into agreement to acquire Rockstar Energy for US$3.85 billion.

In January 2021, as a plan to fight global warming, PepsiCo announced that it is planning to achieve net zero greenhouse gas emissions by 2040, knowing that it had already started generating about 57 million metric tonnes of greenhouse gas emissions globally in 2019.

On August 3, 2021, PespiCo announced that they have agreed to sell a majority stake in  Tropicana, Naked and other North American juice brands to French private equity firm PAI Partners for US$3.3 billion, so that the company can concentrate on its healthy snack food business. Pepsi will hold a 39% stake in the joint venture as well as having exclusive rights to the brand in the USA.

In August 2022, PepsiCo acquired a $550 million stake in the energy drink maker Celsius.

Competition
The Coca-Cola Company has historically been considered PepsiCo's primary competitor in the beverage market, and in December 2005, PepsiCo surpassed The Coca-Cola Company in market value for the first time in 12 years since both companies began to compete. In 2009, The Coca-Cola Company held a higher market share in carbonated soft drink sales within the U.S. In the same year, PepsiCo maintained a higher share of the U.S. refreshment beverage market, however, reflecting the differences in product lines between the two companies. As a result of mergers, acquisitions, and partnerships pursued by PepsiCo in the 1990s and 2000s, its business has shifted to include a broader product base, including foods, snacks, and beverages. The majority of PepsiCo's revenues no longer come from the production and sale of carbonated soft drinks. Beverages accounted for less than 50 percent of its total revenue in 2009. In the same year, slightly more than 60 percent of PepsiCo's beverage sales came from its primary non-carbonated brands, namely Gatorade and Tropicana.

PepsiCo's Frito-Lay and Quaker Oats brands hold a significant share of the U.S. snack food market, accounting for approximately 39 percent of U.S. snack food sales in 2009. One of PepsiCo's primary competitors in the snack food market overall is Kraft Foods (now Mondelez International), which in the same year held 11 percent of the U.S. snack market share.
Other competitors for soda are RC Cola, Keurig Dr. Pepper, and independent brands varying by region.

Soviet Union
In 1959, the USSR held an exhibition of Soviet technology and culture in New York. The United States reciprocated with an exhibition in Sokolniki Park, Moscow, which led to the famous kitchen debate. One of the American products exhibited was Pepsi Cola. After obtaining a photo of U.S. President Richard Nixon and Soviet Premier Nikita Khrushchev sipping Pepsi, PepsiCo executive Donald Kendall was able to capture the attention of the Soviet people and, in 1972, negotiate a cola monopoly in the USSR. Due to Soviet restrictions on transporting roubles abroad, PepsiCo struck a barter deal whereby Stolichnaya vodka would be exchanged for Pepsi syrup. This deal lasted until 1990, when the USSR and PepsiCo re-negotiated a US$3 billion deal to exchange syrup for vodka and a small fleet of decommissioned Soviet warships including 17 submarines, a frigate, a cruiser and a destroyer. This deal fell through before it could take place due to the fall of the Soviet Union and was renegotiated with the former nations of the USSR. The new trade deal included receiving cheese from Russia to supply its Pizza Hut locations and receiving double-hulled tankers from Ukraine. The deal also originated an erroneous factoid which claims that, after acquiring the Soviet fleet, PepsiCo briefly possessed one of the most powerful navies in the world. This is false as, not only did the deal ultimately not take place, it would have only granted PepsiCo "small, old, obsolete, unseaworthy vessels."

Finances 
For the fiscal year 2017, PepsiCo reported earnings of US$4.857 billion, with an annual revenue of US$62.525 billion, an increase of 1.2% over the previous fiscal cycle. PepsiCo's shares traded at over US$109 per share, and its market capitalization was valued at over US$155.9 billion in September 2018. PepsiCo ranked No. 45 on the 2018 Fortune 500 list of the largest United States corporations by total revenue.

Products and brands

PepsiCo's product mix as of 2015 (based on worldwide net revenue) consists of 53 percent foods, and 47 percent beverages. On a worldwide basis, the company's current products lines include several hundred brands that in 2009 were estimated to have generated approximately US$108 billion in cumulative annual retail sales.

The primary identifier of a food and beverage industry main brand is annual sales over US$1 billion. As of 2015, 22 PepsiCo brands met that mark, including: Pepsi, Diet Pepsi, Mountain Dew, Lay's, Gatorade, Tropicana, 7 Up/Teem, Evervess, Doritos, Brisk, Quaker Foods, Cheetos, Mirinda, Ruffles, Aquafina, Naked, Kevita, Propel, Sobe, H2oh, Sabra, Starbucks (ready to Drink Beverages), Pepsi Max, Tostitos, Sierra Mist, Fritos, Walkers, and Bubly.

Business divisions
The structure of PepsiCo's global operations has shifted multiple times in its history as a result of international expansion, and as of December 2021 it is separated into seven main divisions: PepsiCo Beverages North America (PBNA), Frito-Lay North America (FLNA), Quaker Foods North America (QFNA), Latin America, Europe, Africa, Middle East, South Asia (AMESA) and Asia Pacific, Australia/New Zealand, China (APAC). As of 2015, 73 percent of the company's net revenues came from North and South America; 17 percent from Europe and Sub-Saharan Africa; and 10 percent from Asia, the Middle East, and Africa. PepsiCo and its combined subsidiaries employed approximately 263,000 people worldwide as of December 2015.

PepsiCo Beverages North America
This division contributed 35 percent of PepsiCo's net revenue as of 2015, and involves the manufacture (and in some cases licensing), marketing and sales of both carbonated and non-carbonated beverages in North America. The main brands distributed under this division include Pepsi, Mountain Dew, Gatorade, 7 Up (outside the U.S.), Tropicana Pure Premium orange juice, Sierra Mist, SoBe Lifewater, Tropicana juice drinks, AMP Energy, Naked Juice, and Izze. Aquafina, the company's bottled water brand, is also marketed and licensed through North America Beverages. In 2015, PepsiCo also introduced Stubborn Soda, a line of carbonated beverages without high fructose corn syrup.

PepsiCo also has formed partnerships with several beverage brands it does not own, in order to distribute or market them with its own brands. As of 2010, its partnerships include: Starbucks (Frappuccino, DoubleShot, and Iced Coffee), Unilever's Lipton brand (Lipton Brisk and Lipton Iced Tea), and Dole (licensed juices and drinks).

Frito-Lay North America
Frito-Lay North America, the result of a merger in 1961 between the Frito Company and the H.W. Lay Company, produces the top-selling line of snack foods in the U.S. Its main brands in the U.S., Canada, and Mexico include Lay's and Ruffles potato chips; Doritos tortilla chips; Tostitos tortilla chips and dips; Cheetos cheese flavored snacks; Fritos corn chips; Rold Gold pretzels; Sun Chips; and Cracker Jack popcorn. Products made by this division are sold to independent distributors and retailers, and are transported from Frito-Lay's manufacturing plants to distribution centers, principally in vehicles owned and operated by the company.

The division contributed 23 percent of PepsiCo's net revenue in 2015. Until November 2009, Christopher Furman, President of Ventura Foods Inc., occupied the position of Food Services CEO.

Quaker Foods North America
Quaker Foods North America, created following PepsiCo's acquisition of the Quaker Oats Company in 2001, manufactures, markets, and sells Quaker Oatmeal, Rice-A-Roni, Cap'n Crunch, and Life cereals, as well as Near East side dishes within North America. This division also owns and produces the Pearl Milling Company brand, which as of 2009 was the top selling line of syrups and pancake mixes within this region.

Sabritas and Gamesa are two of PepsiCo's food and snack business lines headquartered in Mexico, and they were acquired by PepsiCo in 1966 and 1990, respectively. Sabritas markets Frito-Lay products in Mexico, including local brands such as Poffets, Rancheritos, Crujitos, and Sabritones. Gamesa is the largest manufacturer of cookies in Mexico, distributing brands such as Emperador, Arcoiris and Marías Gamesa.

The division contributed 4 percent of PepsiCo's net revenues in 2015.

Latin America
PepsiCo's Latin America Foods (Spanish: Snacks América Latina) operations market and sell primarily Quaker- and Frito-Lay/Sabritas/Elma Chips-branded snack foods within Mexico, Central and South America, including Argentina, Brazil, Peru, and other countries in this region. Snacks América Latina purchased Peruvian company Karinto S.A.C. including its production company Bocaditas Nacionales (with three production facilities in Peru) from the Hayashida family of Lima in 2009, adding the Karito brand to its product line, including Cuates, Fripapas, and Papi Frits.

The company started a new market strategy to sell its Pepsi Cola product in Mexico, stating that about one-third of the population has difficulty pronouncing "Pepsi". With manufacture and sales of its product under the label 'Pécsi', the advertisement campaign features the Mexican soccer celebrity Cuauhtémoc Blanco. In 2009, PepsiCo had previously used the same strategy successfully in Argentina.

Pepsico will market and distribute Starbucks products in several Latin American countries for 2016.

The division contributed 13 percent of PepsiCo's net revenues in 2015.

Europe
PepsiCo began to expand its distribution in Europe in the 1980s, and in 2015 it made up 17 percent of the company's global net revenue. Unlike PepsiCo's Americas business segments, both foods and beverages are manufactured and marketed under one umbrella division in this region, known as PepsiCo Europe. The primary brands sold by PepsiCo in Europe include Pepsi-Cola beverages, Frito-Lay snacks, Tropicana juices, and Quaker food products, as well as regional brands unique to Europe such as Walkers crisps, Copella, Paw Ridge, Snack-a-Jack, Duyvis, and others. PepsiCo also produces and distributes the soft drink 7UP in Europe via license agreement. PepsiCo has 3 sites in South Africa (Isando, Parrow, and Prospecton) which produce Lay's and Simba chips.

PepsiCo's European presence expanded in Russia in 2009 as the company announced a US$1B investment, and with its acquisition of Russian juice and dairy product brand Wimm-Bill-Dann Foods in December 2010 and Lebedyansky juice producer in March 2008. According to Reuters, "PepsiCo reported that in 2017, its Russian operations generated net revenue of US$3.23 billion, which made up 5.1 percent of the company's total net revenue." Following the 2022 Russian invasion of Ukraine, a number of companies faced growing pressure to halt operations in Russia after not initially doing so. On March 8, 2022, PepsiCo announced in a letter from CEO Laguarta the "suspension of the sale of Pepsi-Cola... our global beverage brands in Russia, including 7 Up and Mirinda... [and] capital investments and all advertising and promotional activities in Russia." However, PepsiCo maintained it had a "responsibility" to continue to sell "milk and other dairy offerings, baby formula and baby food", and that "[b]y continuing to operate, we will also continue to support the livelihoods of our 20,000 Russian associates and the 40,000 Russian agricultural workers in our supply chain". In July 2022, it was announced that PepsiCo will rebrand its products in Russia to PepsiCo Russian brands such as Evervess and Frustyle, in response to the Russian invasion.

, Middle East, South Asia (AMESA)
The AMESA sector consists of the Africa, Middle East and South Asia regions, and features many leading global and local snack brands including Lay's, Cheetos, and Doritos, along with local favorites such as Chipsy (Egypt), Simba (South Africa) and Kurkure (India and Pakistan), as well as various beverage brands including 7UP, Pepsi, Aquafina, Mtn Dew, Mirinda, and Sting.  The AMESA sector covers a wide span of developing and emerging markets, including the key countries of Egypt, India, Saudi Arabia, Pakistan and South Africa. In 2020, PepsiCo acquired Pioneer Foods, a leading food and beverage company in South Africa, adding its robust, well-known brands including Weet-Bix, Bokomo and Ceres to PepsiCo's portfolio.  The Pioneer Foods acquisition is key to PepsiCo's growth strategy across the entire African continent.

In addition to the production and sales of several worldwide Pepsi-Cola, Quaker Foods, and Frito-Lay beverage and food product lines (including Pepsi and Doritos), this segment of PepsiCo's business markets regional brands such as Mirinda, Kurkure, and Red Rock Deli, among others. While PepsiCo owns its own manufacturing and distribution facilities in certain parts of these regions, more of this production is conducted via alternate means such as licensing (which it does with Aquafina), contract manufacturing, joint ventures, and affiliate operations. PepsiCo's businesses in these regions, as of 2015, contributed 10 percent to the company's net revenue worldwide.

In 1992, the Pepsi Number Fever marketing campaign in the Philippines accidentally distributed 800,000 winning bottle caps for a 1 million peso grand prize, leading to riots and the deaths of five people.

In August 2012, PepsiCo signed an agreement with a local Myanmar distributor to sell its soft drinks after a 15-year break to re-enter the country.

SodaStream, which PepsiCo acquired in 2018 is based in Israel, while Sabra (which PepsiCo co-owns with the Israeli food conglomerate Strauss Group) holds a 60% market share for hummus sales in the United States as of 2015. The Strauss Group produces and distributes Frito-Lay products in Israel.

Pacific, Australia/New Zealand, China (APAC)
PepsiCo Australia & New Zealand is located on the Pacific Highway, Chatswood, New South Wales.

Corporate governance
Headquartered in Harrison, New York, in the hamlet of Purchase, with research and development headquarters in Valhalla, New York, PepsiCo's Chairman and CEO is Ramon Laguarta. The board of directors is composed of eleven outside directors as of 2010, including Ray Lee Hunt, Shona Brown, Victor Dzau, Arthur C. Martinez, Sharon Percy Rockefeller, Daniel Vasella, Dina Dublon, Ian M. Cook, Alberto Ibargüen, and Lloyd G. Trotter. Former top executives at PepsiCo include Steven Reinemund, Roger Enrico, D. Wayne Calloway, John Sculley, Michael H. Jordan, Donald M. Kendall, Christopher A. Sinclair, Irene Rosenfeld, David C. Novak, Brenda C. Barnes, and Alfred Steele.

On October 1, 2006, former Chief Financial Officer and President Indra Nooyi replaced Steve Reinemund as chief executive officer. Nooyi remained as the corporation's president, and became Chairman of the Board in May 2007, later (in 2010) being named No.1 on Fortune list of the "50 Most Powerful Women" and No.6 on Forbes list of the "World's 100 Most Powerful Women". PepsiCo received a 100 percent rating on the Corporate Equality Index released by the LGBT-advocate group Human Rights Campaign starting in 2004, the third year of the report.

In November 2014, the firm's president Zein Abdalla announced he would be stepping down from his position at the firm by the end of 2014. In 2017, Ramon Laguarta became the president and became its CEO in 2018.

Headquarters
The PepsiCo headquarters are located in the hamlet of Purchase, New York, in the town and village of Harrison, New York. It was one of the last architectural works by Edward Durell Stone. It consists of seven three-story buildings. Each building is connected to its neighbor through a corner. The property includes the Donald M. Kendall Sculpture Gardens with 45 contemporary sculptures open to the public. Works include those of Alexander Calder, Henry Moore, and Auguste Rodin. Westchester Magazine stated "The buildings' square blocks rise from the ground into low, inverted ziggurats, with each of the three floors having strips of dark windows; patterned pre-cast concrete panels add texture to the exterior surfaces." In 2010 the magazine ranked the building as one of the ten most beautiful buildings in Westchester County.

During the 1960s, PepsiCo had its headquarters in 500 Park Avenue in Midtown Manhattan, New York City. In 1956 PepsiCo paid US$2 million for the previous building at the site. PepsiCo built 500 Park Avenue in 1960. In 1966, Mayor of New York City John Lindsay started a private campaign to convince PepsiCo to remain in New York City.

Charitable activities

PepsiCo has maintained a philanthropic program since 1962 called the PepsiCo Foundation, in which it primarily funds "nutrition and activity, safe water and water usage efficiencies, and education," according to the foundation's website. In 2009, US$27.9 million was contributed through this foundation, including grants to the United Way and YMCA, among others.

In 2009, PepsiCo launched an initiative called the Pepsi Refresh Project, For the first time in 23 years, PepsiCo did not invest in Super Bowl advertising for its iconic brand. Instead, the company diverted this US$20 million to the social media-fueled Pepsi Refresh Project: PepsiCo's innovative cause-marketing program in which consumers submitted ideas for grants for health, environmental, social, educational, and cultural causes. in which individuals submit and vote on charitable and nonprofit collaborations. The main recipients of grants as part of the refresh project are community organizations with a local focus and nonprofit organizations, such as a high school in Michigan that—as a result of being selected in 2010—received US$250,000 towards construction of a fitness room. Following the Gulf of Mexico oil spill in the spring of 2010, PepsiCo donated US$1.3 million to grant winners determined by popular vote. As of October 2010, the company had provided a cumulative total of US$11.7 million in funding, spread across 287 ideas of participant projects from 203 cities in North America. In late 2010, the refresh project was reported to be expanding to include countries outside of North America in 2011.

Working conditions 

In July 2021, Frito-Lay, a subsidiary of PepsiCo became the subject to media attention over poor working conditions at its plant in Topeka. These conditions, which allegedly include forced overtime and 84-hour workweeks for months, led to a strike involving hundreds of workers at the Topeka location. The strike began on July 5 and ended on July 23, after ratifications of a two-year contract that guarantees workers at least one day off each week and raised wages.

Environmental record

Rainforests and palm oil
PepsiCo Palm Oil Commitments published in May 2014 were welcomed by media as a positive step towards ensuring that the company's palm oil purchases will not contribute to deforestation and human rights abuses in the palm oil industry. NGOs warned that the commitments did not go far enough, and in light of the deforestation crisis in Southeast Asia, have called on the company to close the gaps in its policies immediately.

Genetically modified ingredients
PepsiCo has contributed US$1,716,300 to oppose the passage of California Proposition 37, which would mandate the disclosure of genetically modified crops used in the production of California food products. PepsiCo believes "that genetically-modified products can play a role in generating positive economic, social and environmental contributions to societies around the world; particularly in times of food shortages."

Water usage (India, U.S., U.K.)
PepsiCo's usage of water was the subject of controversy in India in the early and mid-2000s, in part because of the company's alleged impact on water usage in a country where water shortages are a perennial issue. In this setting, PepsiCo was perceived by India-based environmental organizations as a company that diverted water to manufacture a discretionary product, making it a target for critics at the time.

As a result, in 2003 PepsiCo launched a country-wide program to achieve a "positive water balance" in India by 2009. In 2007, PepsiCo's then-CEO Indra Nooyi made a trip to India to address water usage practices in the country, prompting prior critic Sunita Narain, director of the Centre for Science & Environment (CSE), to note that PepsiCo "seem(s) to be doing something serious about water now." According to the company's 2009 corporate citizenship report, as well as media reports at the time, the company (in 2009) replenished nearly six billion liters of water within India, exceeding the aggregate water intake of approximately five billion liters by PepsiCo's India manufacturing facilities.

Water usage concerns have arisen at times in other countries where PepsiCo operates. In the U.S., water shortages in certain regions resulted in increased scrutiny on the company's production facilities, which were cited in media reports as being among the largest water users in cities facing drought—such as Atlanta, Georgia. In response, the company formed partnerships with non-profit organizations such as the Earth Institute and Water.org, and in 2009 began cleaning new Gatorade bottles with purified air instead of rinsing with water, among other water conservation practices. In the United Kingdom, also in response to regional drought conditions, PepsiCo snacks brand Walkers' reduced water usage at its largest potato chip facility by 45 percent between the years 2001 and 2008. In doing so, the factory used machinery that captured water naturally contained in potatoes, and used it to offset the need for outside water.

As a result of water reduction practices and efficiency improvements, PepsiCo in 2009 saved more than 12 billion liters of water worldwide, compared to its 2006 water usage. Environmental advocacy organizations including the Natural Resources Defense Council and individual critics such as Rocky Anderson (mayor of Salt Lake City, Utah) voiced concerns in 2009, noting that the company could conserve additional water by refraining from the production of discretionary products such as Aquafina. The company maintained its positioning of bottled water as "healthy and convenient", while also beginning to partially offset environmental impacts of such products through alternate means, including packaging weight reduction.

Pesticide regulation (India)

PepsiCo's India operations were met with substantial resistance in 2003 and again in 2006, when an environmental organization in New Delhi made the claim that, based on its research, it believed that the levels of pesticides in PepsiCo (along with those from rival The Coca-Cola Company), exceeded a set of proposed safety standards on soft drink ingredients that had been developed by the Bureau of Indian Standards. PepsiCo denied the allegations, and India's health ministry has also dismissed the allegations—both questioning the accuracy of the data compiled by the CSE, as it was tested by its own internal laboratories without being verified by outside peer review. The ensuing dispute prompted a short-lived ban on the sale of PepsiCo and The Coca-Cola Company soft drinks within India's southwestern state of Kerala in 2006; however this ban was reversed by the Kerala High Court one month later.

In November 2010, the Supreme Court of India invalidated a criminal complaint filed against PepsiCo India by the Kerala government, on the basis that the beverages did meet local standards at the time of the allegations. The court ruling stated that the "percentage of pesticides" found in the tested beverages was "within the tolerance limits subsequently prescribed in respect of such product," since at the time of testing "there was no provision governing pesticide adulteration in cold drinks." In 2010, PepsiCo was among the 12 multinational companies that displayed "the most impressive corporate social responsibility credentials in emerging markets", as determined by the U.S. Department of State. PepsiCo's India unit received recognition on the basis of its water conservation and safety practices and corresponding results.

Packaging and recycling
Environmental advocates have raised concern over the environmental impacts surrounding the disposal of PepsiCo's bottled beverage products in particular, as bottle recycling rates for the company's products in 2009 averaged 34 percent within the U.S. In 2019, BreakFreeFromPlastic named PepsiCo a top 10 global plastic polluter for the second year in a row. The company has employed efforts to minimize these environmental impacts via packaging developments combined with recycling initiatives. In 2010, PepsiCo announced a goal to create partnerships that prompt an increase in the beverage container recycling rate in the U.S. to 50 percent by 2018.

One strategy enacted to reach this goal has been the placement of interactive recycling kiosks called "Dream Machines" in supermarkets, convenience stores, and gas stations, with the intent of increasing access to recycling receptacles. The use of resin to manufacture its plastic bottles has resulted in reduced packaging weight, which in turn reduces the volume of fossil fuels required to transport certain PepsiCo products. The weight of Aquafina bottles was reduced nearly 40 percent, to 15 grams, with a packaging redesign in 2009. Also in that year, PepsiCo brand Naked Juice began production and distribution of the first 100 percent post-consumer recycled plastic bottle.

On March 15, 2011, PepsiCo unveiled the world's first plant-based PET bottle. The bottle is made from plant-based materials, such as switch grass, corn husks, and pine bark, and is 100% recyclable. PepsiCo plans to reuse more by-products of its manufacturing processes such as orange peels and oat hulls in the bottles. PepsiCo has identified methods to create a molecular structure that is the same as normal petroleum-based PET—which will make the new bottle technology, dubbed "Green Bottle", similar to Coke's "PlantBottle" idea from 2009, which feel the same as normal PET. PepsiCo have said to pilot production in 2012, and upon successful completion of the pilot, intends moving to full-scale commercialization, however in 2021 there are still no records of such bottles being produced.

In a bid to reduce packaging consumption, in recent years the PepsiCoPartners launched as a service offering carbonated drinks dispensers within the US. The dispensers are currently being trialed in large corporate offices and universities.

In 2020 PepsiCo teamed up with French biochemistry startup Carbios in order to promote and establish a new recycling method for used plastic bottles. This method uses enzymes to dissolve plastic very thoroughly and the final leftovers can be used to produce textiles.

Energy usage and carbon footprint
PepsiCo, along with other manufacturers in its industry, has drawn criticism from environmental advocacy groups for the production and distribution of plastic product packaging, which consumed an additional  of petrochemicals in 2008. These critics have also expressed apprehension over the production volume of plastic packaging, which results in the emission of carbon dioxide. Beginning largely in 2006, PepsiCo began development of more efficient means of producing and distributing its products using less energy, while also placing a focus on emissions reduction. In a comparison of 2009 energy usage with recorded usage in 2006, the company's per-unit use of energy was reduced by 16 percent in its beverage plants and 7 percent in snack plants.

In 2009, Tropicana (owned by PepsiCo) was the first brand in the U.S. to determine the carbon footprint of its orange juice product, as certified by the Carbon Trust, an outside auditor of carbon emissions. Also in 2009, PepsiCo began the test deployment of so-called "green vending machines", which reduce energy usage by 15 percent in comparison to average models in use. It developed these machines in coordination with Greenpeace, which described the initiative as "transforming the industry in a way that is going to be more climate-friendly to a great degree."

Product nutrition
According to its 2009 annual report, PepsiCo states that it is "committed to delivering sustainable growth by investing in a healthier future for people and our planet," which it has defined in its mission statement since 2006 as "Performance with Purpose". According to news and magazine coverage on the subject in 2010, the objective of this initiative is to increase the number and variety of healthier food and beverage products made available to its customers, employ a reduction in the company's environmental impact, and to facilitate diversity and healthy lifestyles within its employee base. Its activities in regards to the pursuit of its goals—namely environmental impacts of production and the nutritional composition of its products—have been the subject of recognition from health and environmental advocates and organizations, and at times have raised concerns among its critics. As the result of a more recent focus on such efforts, "critics consider (PepsiCo) to be perhaps the most proactive and progressive of the food companies", according to former New York Times food industry writer Melanie Warner in 2010.

Product diversity
From its founding in 1965 until the early 1990s, the majority of PepsiCo's product line consisted of carbonated soft drinks and convenience snacks. PepsiCo broadened its product line substantially throughout the 1990s and 2000s with the acquisition and development of what its CEO deemed as "good-for-you" products, including Quaker Oats, Naked Juice, and Tropicana orange juice. Sales of such healthier-oriented PepsiCo brands totaled US$10 billion in 2009, representing 18 percent of the company's total revenue in that year. This movement into a broader, healthier product range has been moderately well received by nutrition advocates; though commentators in this field have also suggested that PepsiCo market its healthier items as aggressively as less-healthy core products.

In response to shifting consumer preferences and in part due to increasing governmental regulation, PepsiCo in 2010 indicated its intention to grow this segment of its business, forecasting that sales of fruit, vegetable, whole grain, and fiber-based products will amount to US$30 billion by 2020. To meet this intended target, the company has said that it plans to acquire additional health-oriented brands while also making changes to the composition of existing products that it sells.

Ingredient changes in Pepsi
Public health advocates have suggested that there may be a link between the ingredient makeup of PepsiCo's core snack and carbonated soft drink products and rising rates of health conditions such as obesity and diabetes. The company aligns with personal responsibility advocates, who assert that food and beverages with higher proportions of sugar or salt content are fit for consumption in moderation by individuals who also exercise on a regular basis.

Changes to the composition of its products with nutrition in mind have involved reducing fat content, moving away from trans-fats, and producing products in calorie-specific serving sizes to discourage overconsumption, among other changes. One of the earlier ingredient changes involved sugar and caloric reduction, with the introduction of Diet Pepsi in 1964 and Pepsi Max in 1993—both of which are variants of their full-calorie counterpart, Pepsi. More recent changes have consisted of saturated fat reduction, which Frito-Lay reduced by 50% in Lay's and Ruffles potato chips in the U.S. between 2006 and 2009. Also in 2009, PepsiCo's Tropicana brand introduced a new variation of orange juice (Trop50) sweetened in part by the plant Stevia, which reduced calories by half. Since 2007, the company also made available lower-calorie variants of Gatorade, which it calls "G2". On May 5, 2014, PepsiCo announced that the company would remove brominated vegetable oil from many of its products, but a timeframe was not discussed.

Distribution to children
As public perception placed additional scrutiny on the marketing and distribution of carbonated soft drinks to children, PepsiCo announced in 2010 that by 2012, it will remove beverages with higher sugar content from primary and secondary schools worldwide. It also, under voluntary guidelines adopted in 2006, replaced "full-calorie" beverages in U.S. schools with "lower-calorie" alternatives, leading to a 95 percent reduction in the 2009 sales of full-calorie variants in these schools in comparison to the sales recorded in 2004. In 2008, in accordance with guidelines adopted by the International Council of Beverages Associations, PepsiCo eliminated the advertising and marketing of products that do not meet its nutrition standards, to children under the age of 12.

In 2010, Michelle Obama initiated a campaign to end childhood obesity (titled Let's Move!), in which she sought to encourage healthier food options in public schools, improved food nutrition labeling, and increased physical activity for children. In response to this initiative, PepsiCo, along with food manufacturers Campbell Soup, Coca-Cola, General Mills, and others in an alliance referred to as the "Healthy Weight Commitment Foundation", announced in 2010 that the companies will collectively cut one trillion calories from their products sold by the end of 2012 and 1.5 trillion calories by the end of 2015.

See also

 Cola wars
 Joan Crawford
 List of assets owned by PepsiCo
 Pepsi Stuff

References

External links
 

 PepsiCo, FritoLay and Pepsi-Cola Annual Reports (1938-2017), Archive of Annual Reports, Internet Archive

 
1965 establishments in North Carolina
American companies established in 1965
1960s initial public offerings
Companies based in Purchase, New York
Companies formerly listed on the New York Stock Exchange
Companies listed on the Nasdaq
Conglomerate companies established in 1965
Conglomerate companies of the United States
Drink companies of the United States
Food and drink companies based in New York (state)
Food and drink companies established in 1965
Companies that filed for Chapter 11 bankruptcy in 1923
Companies that filed for Chapter 11 bankruptcy in 1931
Multinational companies headquartered in the United States
Multinational food companies